The 1911–12 season was the 20th in the history of the Western Football League.

The league champions this season were Welton Rovers, the first time that the club had won the league.

Final table
Two new clubs joined the league, and the number of clubs increased from 10 to 11 clubs, after Bristol City Reserves left the league.
Peasedown St John
Street

References

1911-12
1911–12 in Welsh football
1911–12 in English association football leagues